John Maddison is a British former sports shooter.

Sports shooting career
Maddison represented England and won a silver medal in the running target, at the 1990 Commonwealth Games in Auckland, New Zealand.

References

Living people
British male sport shooters
Shooters at the 1990 Commonwealth Games
Commonwealth Games medallists in shooting
Commonwealth Games silver medallists for England
Year of birth missing (living people)
Medallists at the 1990 Commonwealth Games